"Put on Your Red Dress" is a song by British musician Martin Page, released as the third and final single from his debut album In the House of Stone and Light. There was no music video made to accompany the song, however, a radio edit was made.

The single is generally looked as an attempt to gain international sales, particularly in Germany. Page's first single, "In the House of Stone and Light", was the B-side to "Put on Your Red Dress", and slightly increased the popularity of the song in 1995.

This is considered to be Page's last single, as the songs released on his second album, released on his own record label, were not made into singles.

As stated by Page in the album's EPK, "The song 'Put on Your Red Dress' is a romantic song, about basically saying we've been through some ups and downs, but I'm going to come to your house, knock on your door, we're going to walk down to the docks, and we're going to forget about our problems."

Notes 

1994 songs
1995 singles
Martin Page songs
Songs written by Martin Page
Mercury Records singles